Harsiese (also Horsiese or Harsiesis, plus other variants) was an ancient Egyptian theophoric name, literally meaning "Horus, son of Isis". A related name is Siese. Some people by this name include:
 Harsiese A, an independent king in Upper Egypt during the Twenty-second Dynasty
 Harsiese B, a High Priest of Amun from the end of Osorkon II's reign to Year 19 of Pedubast I
 Harsiese (C), a Second Prophet of Amun
 Harsiese (High Priest of Ptah), served as High Priest of Ptah during the reign of Psusennes I
 Harsiesi, native rebel against Ptolemy VIII Physcon

See also
 Harsiesis (disambiguation)

Ancient Egyptian given names
Egyptian masculine given names
Theophoric names
Horus